Sir Edmund Dunch (1551–1623) was an English MP and High Sheriff.

He was born the son of William Dunch (1508–1597) of Little Wittenham in Berkshire (now Oxfordshire) and educated at Magdalen College, Oxford.

He was returned as MP for Wallingford in Berkshire (now Oxfordshire) in 1571 and later for Wootton Bassett (1584–1585) and was High Sheriff of Berkshire for 1587 and 1603.

He married Anne Fettiplace in 1576. His sons Sir William Dunch (1578–1611) and Samuel Dunch both also represented Wallingford as MPs.

References
 Annells, P. (2006) The Berkshire Dunches.
 Hedges, J.K. (1881) Wallingford History, Wm Clowes, London

External links 
Wallingford History Gateway

1551 births
1623 deaths
Alumni of Magdalen College, Oxford
People from Vale of White Horse (district)
High Sheriffs of Berkshire
17th-century English people
English MPs 1571
English MPs 1584–1585
People from Little Wittenham